The Family Songbook is a studio album by American trio The Haden Triplets. It was released on January 24, 2020, through Trimeter Records.

Track listing

References

2020 albums
Albums recorded at Electro-Vox Recording Studios
The Haden Triplets albums